Anderson Mall is a regional shopping mall located in Anderson County, South Carolina.  The mall, which is anchored by Belk, JCPenney, and Dillard's, has  GLA.

History

Anderson Mall opened in March 1972 with 43 stores.  The mall was anchored by department stores: JCPenney, Meyers Arnold, and G.C. Murphy. In 1984 both Belk (then known as Gallant Belk) and Sears closed their Downtown Anderson stores and moved to the newly expanded and renovated mall. This expansion was first announced in 1982. Meyers Arnold was later purchased by Uptons, and after that chain closed, that spot became a Belk Men's & Home store.

In 2007, the Belk Men's & Home store closed, with the Men's store moving into the existing Women's & Kids store.  The Home Store relocated to an adjacent mall space next to the main Belk.  These moves were to make way for a new store, Dillard's, which opened in late 2008. The entire mall and numerous other stores were also remodeled around that time.

On May 31, 2018, it was announced that Sears would be closing as part of a plan to close 72 stores nationwide. The store closed in September 2018.

On June 4, 2020, JCPenney announced that it would be closing as part of a plan to close 154 stores nationwide. However it was removed from the closing list on June 23, 2020 and will remain open for now.

Anchors
All Anchors are One Level Stores.
Belk (134,639 sq ft.), opened 1984
JCPenney (125,020 sq ft.), opened 1972. 
Sears (94,959 sq ft.), opened 1984, closed September 2018
Dillard's (108,000 sq ft.), opened 2008

References

External links 
 

Anderson, South Carolina
Shopping malls established in 1972
Shopping malls in South Carolina
Buildings and structures in Anderson County, South Carolina
Tourist attractions in Anderson County, South Carolina
1972 establishments in South Carolina
Kohan Retail Investment Group